George Bliss (January 1, 1813 – October 24, 1868) was a member of the United States House of Representatives from Ohio for two non-consecutive terms in the 1850s and 1860s.

Early life and career 
Bliss was born in Jericho, Vermont. He attended Granville College. Moved to Ohio in 1832, studied law with David Kellogg Cartter, was admitted to the bar in 1841 and became Cartter's law partner in Akron, Ohio.

Bliss was Mayor of Akron in 1850. In 1850 he was appointed the presiding judge of the eighth judicial district and continued in that role until the office was discontinued after a constitutional change.

Congress 
He was elected to the Thirty-third Congress (4 March 1853 – 3 March 1855) as a Democrat. Bliss subsequently withdrew his nomination for re-election. He continued practising law in Wooster, Ohio. In 1858, he was principal counsel and attorney in the Oberlin–Wellington Rescue case, assisting George Belden of Canton, the United States District Attorney for the Northern District of Ohio, in the prosecution. Both conspirators were found guilty by the jury in the court of judge Hiram V. Willson, and punished.

Bliss was elected to the Thirty-eighth congress (4 March 1863 – 3 March 1865) and was an unsuccessful candidate for re-election in 1864. He was a delegate to the Union National Convention at Philadelphia, Pennsylvania in 1866.

Death 
George Bliss died in Wooster, Ohio on 24 October 1868 and is buried in Oak Hill Cemetery.

Married Sarah J. Fish of Williamstown, New York, and they had five children. After Bliss died, his family moved to Brooklyn, New York.

Sources

1813 births
1868 deaths
People from Jericho, Vermont
Ohio state court judges
Politicians from Akron, Ohio
People from Wooster, Ohio

Democratic Party members of the United States House of Representatives from Ohio

Mayors of Akron, Ohio
Denison University alumni
19th-century American politicians
19th-century American judges